Jah Kingdom is a studio album by the Jamaican musician Burning Spear, released in 1991. Burning Spear supported the album with a North American tour.

Production
Jah Kingdom was produced by Winston Rodney and Nelson Miller. Burning Spear employed horns and synthesizers on the album, which was recorded with the Burning Band. The cover of the Grateful Dead's "Estimated Prophet" first appeared on the tribute album Deadicated.

Critical reception

Entertainment Weekly praised Rodney's "high silk voice." The Washington Post determined that, "pared down to the essentials, the arrangements generally mirror Rodney's economical phrasing, and if they're missing some of the grittiness that characterizes his singing (and some of his lyrics), at least the gloss isn't insufferably thick."

The Gazette opined that the album "is crisply produced, pleasant enough and the band is hard at work, but the singer seems disinterested." The Boston Herald noted Rodney's "ability to write politico-religious lyrics that are by turns angry and joyful, stinging and gentle."

AllMusic wrote that the band "plays with a lighter touch than what was normally heard on Spear's previous albums."

Track listing
"Jah Kingdom"
"Praise Him"
"Come, Come"
"World Power"
"Tumble Down"
"Call On Jah"
"Should I"
"When Jah Call"
"Thank You"
"Land of My Birth"
"Estimated Prophet"

Credits
All songs written by Winston Rodney except track 11 (B Weir/J Barlow)
Executive Producer - Burning Music Production
Track 11 Produced & Arranged by Ralph Sall, originally released on Arista Records album Deadicated
Recorded at Grove Recording Studio, Ocho Rios, Jamaica
Recording engineer - Barry O'Hare
Assistant engineer - Andrew Thomas
Mixed at Platinum Island Studios, New York
Mixed by Michael Sauvage
Assistants - Barry O'Hare, Mervyn Williams
Studio Assistant - Wes Naprstek
Mastered at Masterdisk by Tony Dawsey
Art Direction - Deborah Melian
Front Cover Artwork - Tony Ramsay
Photography - Chris Carroll

Musicians
Winston Rodney - vocals, percussion
Nelson Miller - drums
Paul Beckford - bass
Lenford Richards - lead guitar, piano ("World Power"), Casio PG 380 (solo "Thank You")
Lenval Jarrett - rhythm guitar
Alvin Haughton - percussion
Charles Dickey - trombone
James Smith - trumpet (solo "Thank You")
Mark Wilson- saxophone
Jay Noel - keyboards
Additional Musicians
Robbie Lyn - synthesizers, piano
Ronald "Nambo" Robinson - trombone (tracks 1,3,4,5&10)
Junior "Chico" Chin - trumpet (tracks 1,3,4,5&10)
Dean Fraser - saxes (tracks 1,3,4,5&10)
Richard Johnson - piano (tracks 5,7&9)

References

Burning Spear albums
1991 albums
Mango Records albums